Capucins may refer to:
 Order of Friars Minor Capuchin
 Capucins, Quebec, a former municipality that is now part of Cap-Chat, Quebec